Stucchi was an Italian professional cycling team that existed in part between 1909 and 1951. Its main sponsor was Italian company Stucchi & Co. The team had two riders that won the general classification of the Giro d'Italia, Alfonso Calzolari in 1914 and Costante Girardengo in 1919.

References

External links

Defunct cycling teams based in Italy
1909 establishments in Italy
1951 disestablishments in Italy
Cycling teams established in 1909
Cycling teams disestablished in 1951